Stade du Pays de Charleroi is a football stadium in the city of Charleroi, Belgium.  It was built for the 2000 UEFA European Championship in Belgium and the Netherlands in replacement of the old stadium known as Mambourg.  The name Stade du Mambourg officially changed in front of 25,000 spectators on 24 May 1999 during the inaugural match between Sporting and Metz. It is the home of Sporting Charleroi.  Its capacity was 30,000 for Euro 2000 but was reduced shortly after to 25,000 in line with Charleroi's average attendances. 
The capacity was reduced again in 2013 to 15,000. After the capacity reduction, the stands T2, T3, T4 were covered by a new roof. Between 2014 and 2015, minor adjustments to the seating and compliance of the stands for European competitions have been made. The future of this structure of Charleroi is in doubt as the club plans to move to a brand new stadium in the periphery of the city.

Important matches

2000 UEFA European Championship Group Stage:

2003-04 UEFA Cup
R.A.A. Louviéroise 1 - 1 S.L. Benfica
Football World Cup 2006 - European Qualification Groups
Belgium 1 - 1 Lithuania

References

External links
Stadium Guide Article
UEFA 2000 Profile (Archived)

Pays de Charleroi
Football venues in Wallonia
Sports venues in Hainaut (province)
Buildings and structures in Charleroi
R. Charleroi S.C.